Milko Olavi Tokola (born ) is a Finnish male weightlifter, competing in the 85 kg category and representing Finland at international competitions.

He participated at the 2016 Summer Olympics in the men's 85 kg event finishing 19th. He competed at world championships, most recently at the 2014 World Weightlifting Championships.

Major results

References

External links

1992 births
Living people
Finnish male weightlifters
Weightlifters at the 2016 Summer Olympics
Olympic weightlifters of Finland
People from Kalajoki
Sportspeople from North Ostrobothnia
20th-century Finnish people
21st-century Finnish people